Gibberula diplostreptus is a species of sea snail, a marine gastropod mollusk, in the family Cystiscidae.

References

diplostreptus
Gastropods described in 1915
Cystiscidae